Saint-Ébremond-de-Bonfossé is a former commune in the Manche department in Normandy in north-western France. On 1 January 2017, it was merged into the commune Canisy. Its population was 719 in 2019.

See also
Communes of the Manche department

References

Saintebremonddebonfosse